The Nitrososphaerota (syn. Thaumarchaeota) are a phylum of the Archaea proposed in 2008 after the genome of Cenarchaeum symbiosum was sequenced and found to differ significantly from other members of the  hyperthermophilic phylum Thermoproteota (formerly Crenarchaeota).  Three described species in addition to C. symbiosum are Nitrosopumilus maritimus, Nitrososphaera viennensis, and Nitrososphaera gargensis. The phylum was proposed in 2008 based on phylogenetic data, such as the sequences of these organisms' ribosomal RNA genes, and the presence of a form of type I topoisomerase that was previously thought to be unique to the eukaryotes. This assignment was confirmed by further analysis published in 2010 that examined the genomes of the ammonia-oxidizing archaea Nitrosopumilus maritimus and Nitrososphaera gargensis, concluding that these species form a distinct lineage that includes Cenarchaeum symbiosum. The lipid crenarchaeol has been found only in Nitrososphaerota, making it a potential biomarker for the phylum. Most organisms of this lineage thus far identified are chemolithoautotrophic ammonia-oxidizers and may play important roles in biogeochemical cycles, such as the nitrogen cycle and the carbon cycle. Metagenomic sequencing indicates that they constitute ~1% of the sea surface metagenome across many sites.

Nitrososphaerota-derived GDGT lipids from marine sediments can be used to reconstruct past temperatures via the TEX86 paleotemperature proxy, as these lipids vary in structure according to temperature. Because most Nitrososphaerota seem to be autotrophs that fix CO2, their GDGTs can act as a record for past Carbon-13 ratios in the dissolved inorganic carbon pool, and thus have the potential to be used for reconstructions of the carbon cycle in the past.

Taxonomy

The currently accepted taxonomy is based on the List of Prokaryotic names with Standing in Nomenclature (LPSN) and National Center for Biotechnology Information (NCBI)
 Class Nitrososphaeria Stieglmeier et al. 2014 [Conexivisphaeria Kato et al. 2020]
 ?"Cenoporarchaeum" corrig. Zhang et al. 2019
 ?"Candidatus Giganthauma" Muller et al. 2010
 Order "Geothermarchaeales" 
 Order Conexivisphaerales Kato et al. 2020
 Family Conexivisphaeraceae Kato et al. 2020
 Conexivisphaera Kato et al. 2020
 Order "Nitrosocaldales" de la Torre et al. 2008
 Family "Nitrosocaldaceae" Qin et al. 2016
 ?"Candidatus Nitrosothermus" Luo et al. 2021 
 "Candidatus Nitrosocaldus" de la Torre et al. 2008
 Order Nitrososphaerales Stieglmeier et al. 2014
 Family Methylarchaceae Hua et al. 2019
 ?"Candidatus Methylarchaeum" Hua et al. 2019 
 Family Nitrososphaeraceae Stieglmeier et al. 2014
 "Candidatus Nitrosocosmicus" Lehtovirta-Morley et al. 2016
 Nitrososphaera Stieglmeier et al. 2014
 Order Nitrosopumilales Qin et al. 2017
 Family Nitrosopumilaceae Qin et al. 2017
 ?"Candidatus Nitrosospongia" Moeller et al. 2019
 "Candidatus Nitrosotalea" Lehtovirta 2011
 "Candidatus Nitrosotenuis" Li et al. 2016
 "Candidatus Nitrosopelagicus" Santoro et al. 2015
 "Cenarchaeum" DeLong & Preston 1996
 Nitrosarchaeum corrig. Jung et al. 2018
 Nitrosopumilus Qin et al. 2017

Metabolism
Nitrososphaerota are important ammonia oxidizers in aquatic and terrestrial environments, and are the first archaea identified as being involved in nitrification. They are capable of oxidizing ammonia at much lower substrate concentrations than ammonia-oxidizing bacteria, and so probably dominate in oligotrophic conditions. Their ammonia oxidation pathway requires less oxygen than that of ammonia-oxidizing bacteria, so they do better in environments with low oxygen concentrations like sediments and hot springs. Ammonia-oxidizing Nitrososphaerota can be identified metagenomically by the presence of archaeal ammonia monooxygenase (amoA) genes, which indicate that they are overall more dominant than ammonia oxidizing bacteria. In addition to ammonia, at least one Nitrososphaerota strain has been shown to be able to use urea as a substrate for nitrification. This would allow for competition with phytoplankton that also grow on urea. One study of microbes from wastewater treatment plants found that not all Nitrososphaerota that express amoA genes are active ammonia oxidizers. These Nitrososphaerota may be capable of oxidizing methane instead of ammonia, or they may be heterotrophic, indicating a potential for a diversity of metabolic lifestyles within the phylum. Marine Nitrososphaerota have also been shown to produce nitrous oxide, which as a greenhouse gas has implications for climate change. Isotopic analysis indicates that most nitrous oxide flux to the atmosphere from the ocean, which provides around 30% of the natural flux, may be due to the metabolic activities of archaea.

Many members of the phylum assimilate carbon by fixing HCO3−. This is done using a hydroxypropionate/hydroxybutyrate cycle similar to the Thermoproteota but which appears to have evolved independently. All Nitrososphaerota that have been identified by metagenomics thus far encode this pathway. Notably, the Nitrososphaerota CO2-fixation pathway is more efficient than any known aerobic autotrophic pathway. This efficiency helps explain their ability to thrive in low-nutrient environments. Some Nitrososphaerota such as Nitrosopumilus maritimus are able to incorporate organic carbon as well as inorganic, indicating a capacity for mixotrophy. At least two isolated strains have been identified as obligate mixotrophs, meaning they require a source of organic carbon in order to grow.

A study has revealed that Nitrososphaerota are most likely the dominant producers of the critical vitamin B12. This finding has important implications for eukaryotic phytoplankton, many of which are auxotrophic and must acquire vitamin B12 from the environment; thus the Nitrososphaerota could play a role in algal blooms and by extension global levels of atmospheric carbon dioxide. Because of the importance of vitamin B12 in biological processes such as the citric acid cycle and DNA synthesis, production of it by the Nitrososphaerota may be important for a large number of aquatic organisms.

Environment
Many Nitrososphaerota, such as Nitrosopumilus maritimus, are marine and live in the open ocean. Most of these planktonic Nitrososphaerota, which compose the Marine Group I.1a, are distributed in the subphotic zone, between 100m and 350m. Other marine Nitrososphaerota live in shallower waters. One study has identified two novel Nitrososphaerota species living in the sulfidic environment of a tropical mangrove swamp. Of these two species, Candidatus Giganthauma insulaporcus and Candidatus Giganthauma karukerense, the latter is associated with Gammaproteobacteria with which it may have a symbiotic relationship, though the nature of this relationship is unknown. The two species are very large, forming filaments larger than ever before observed in archaea. As with many Nitrososphaerota, they are mesophilic. Genetic analysis and the observation that the most basal identified Nitrososphaerota genomes are from hot environments suggests that the ancestor of Nitrososphaerota was thermophilic, and mesophily evolved later.

See also 
 Eocyte hypothesis

References

Further reading 

  
  
  

2008 in science
Archaea
Vitamin B12
Archaea phyla